Achit Lake is the largest freshwater lake in Uvs Aimag (Uvs province), Mongolia, in the west of the country. At an elevation of 1,435 m above sea level it covers an area of 290 km2. It is 28 km long, 16 km wide, and 10 m deep. The coast is covered with steppes, mostly hilly but swampy on the northwest and northeast. Several rivers flow into the lake.

See also
Ramsar sites in Mongolia

References

External links
The Annotated Ramsar List: Mongolia
Big Soviet Encyclopaedia – Russian (АЧИТ-НУР)
Limnological Catalog of Mongolian Lakes

Lakes of Mongolia
Ramsar sites in Mongolia